Grammofonleverantörernas förening (GLF), or the Swedish Recording Industry Association in English, is an organization representing the music recording industry of Sweden. It has compiled and published the official record charts for the Swedish music recording industry since 1975, including the Swedish Albums Chart and Swedish Singles Chart. The charts are based on statistics of album and single sales, DVD-sales, digital sales as well as streams.

GLF has the following members: Bonnier Amigo Group, EMI Svenska AB, Network Entertainment Group (MNW?), Sony Music Sweden AB, Sound Pollution AB, Universal Music Sweden AB , and Warner Music Group Sweden AB. Since 1986 GLF has operated the Grammotex online catalog of recordings, currently holding 100,000 titles. The catalog service is open to music stores and distributors who pay a fee.

External links 
Grammotex, online catalog
Sverigetopplistan, Swedish weekly charts for singles, albums, DVD, and downloads

References

Music organizations based in Sweden
Music industry associations